Gol Gohar Sport Complex (Shahid Soleimani Sport Complex) is the own sports complex of Gol Gohar Cultural and Sport Club based in Sirjan, Iran. The sports complex includes sports halls, an indoor swimming pool and a football stadium. The stadium is able to hold 3,200 people. It is the home venue of Gol Gohar Football Club.

References

Football venues in Iran